Beryllium nitride, Be3N2, is a nitride of beryllium. It can be prepared from the elements at high temperature (1100–1500 °C); unlike beryllium azide or BeN6, it decomposes in vacuum into beryllium and nitrogen. It is readily hydrolysed forming beryllium hydroxide and ammonia. It has two polymorphic forms cubic α-Be3N2 with a defect anti-fluorite structure, and hexagonal β-Be3N2. It reacts with silicon nitride, Si3N4 in a stream of ammonia at 1800–1900 °C to form BeSiN2.

Preparation
Beryllium nitride is prepared by heating beryllium metal powder with dry nitrogen in an oxygen-free atmosphere in temperatures between 700 and 1400 °C.
 3Be + N2  → Be3N2

Uses
It is used in refractory ceramics as well as in nuclear reactors and to produce radioactive carbon-14 for tracer applications.

Reactions
Beryllium nitride reacts with mineral acids producing ammonia and the corresponding salts of the acids:
 Be3N2 + 6 HCl → 3 BeCl2 + 2 NH3

In strong alkali solutions, a beryllate forms, with evolution of ammonia:
 Be3N2 + 6 NaOH → 3 Na2BeO2 + 2 NH3

Both the acid and alkali reactions are brisk and vigorous. Reaction with water, however, is very slow:
 Be3N2 + 6 H2O → 3 Be(OH)2 + 2 NH3

Reactions with oxidizing agents are likely to be violent. It is oxidized when heated at 600 °C in air.

References

Nitrides
Beryllium compounds
Refractory materials